The pearl kite (Gampsonyx swainsonii) is a very small raptor found in open savanna habitat adjacent to deciduous woodland. It is the only member of the genus Gampsonyx. The scientific name commemorates the English naturalist William Swainson.

Taxonomy and systematics
The type specimen was collected from Brazil by English naturalist William Swainson, and described by Nicholas Aylward Vigors in 1825. Vigors noted the similarity to both hawks and falcons, but placed Gampsonyx within the "Accipitrine subfamily" because it lacks the notched beak of the falcons. He also noted its striking resemblance to the coloration of the falconets.

Later, the pearl kite was classified with the falcons. For example, Peters placed it with the forest falcons in subfamily Polyhieracinae. In the mid-20th century it was found to be related to Elanus based on morphology and its molt schedule.

Distribution and habitat
This tiny kite breeds from Panama, Colombia and Venezuela south to Bolivia and northern Argentina, with an isolated sedentary population in Nicaragua. It is expanding its range and was proved to breed on Trinidad in 1970. It was first reported in Costa Rica in the mid-1990s, and now is fairly common along Pacific slope, to 1000m.

Description

It is the smallest raptor in the Americas and one of the two smallest accipitrids in the world (besides the little sparrowhawk). The tiny hawk, another neotropical species, attains a slightly higher weight than the pearl kite. The adult has a black crown, upperparts, wing and tail, a rufous edged white collar, yellow forehead and cheeks, mainly white underparts, and yellow legs. Immature birds are similar to the adults but have white and chestnut tips to the back and wing feathers, a buff collar and some buff on the white underparts. In flight this species looks mainly black above and white below. The northern form G. s. leonae differs from the nominate G. s. swainsonii in that it has rufous flanks.

Behaviour

Breeding
The nest is a deep cup of sticks built high in a tree. The clutch is 2-4 brown-marked white eggs, incubated mainly by the female for 34–35 days to hatching, with a further five weeks to fledging. There may be two broods in a season.

Feeding
The pearl kite feeds mainly on lizards, such as the Anolis and geckos. However, its most common prey is the Microlophus occipitalis. It also takes small birds (such as ruddy ground doves), frogs and insects (such as cockroaches); it usually sits on a high open perch from which it swoops on its prey. The call is a high musical pip-pip-pip-pip or kitty-kitty-kitty.

Notes

References

External links

Pearl Kite videos on the Internet Bird Collection
Pearl Kite photo gallery VIREO Photo-High Res
 
 
 Illustration, plate IX in The Genera of Birds, 2ed. vol. 1 (G. R. Gray, 1849)
 Synonymy in Catalogue of the Accipitres or Diurnal Birds of Prey in the British Museum, (Sharpe 1874).

pearl kite
pearl kite
Birds of the Guianas
Birds of Brazil
Birds of the Amazon Basin
Birds of Trinidad and Tobago
Birds of Nicaragua
Birds of Costa Rica
Birds of Panama
Birds of prey of South America
pearl kite